5th Avenue station or Fifth Avenue station may refer to:

5th Avenue station (PNR), a railway station in Caloocan, Metro Manila, Philippines
5th Avenue station (LRT), a light metro station in Caloocan, Metro Manila, Philippines
Fifth Avenue–59th Street station, a subway station in Manhattan, New York, United States
5th Avenue (IRT Flushing Line), a subway station in Manhattan, New York, United States
Fifth Avenue/53rd Street station, a subway station in Manhattan, New York, United States
Mall/Southwest 5th Avenue station, a light rail station in Portland, Oregon, United States
Pioneer Place/Southwest 5th station, a light rail station in Portland, Oregon, United States
Fifth Avenue station (San Diego), a trolley stop in San Diego, California, United States
Fifth/Lake station, a former "L" station in Chicago, Illinois, United States

See also
5th Street station (disambiguation)